North Newton is a city in Harvey County, Kansas, United States.   As of the 2020 census, the population of the city was 1,814.  It is located between the north side of the city of Newton (separate entity) and the south side of Interstate I-135.  North Newton is home of Bethel College.

History
For millennia, the land now known as Kansas was inhabited by Native Americans.  In 1803, most of modern Kansas was secured by the United States as part of the Louisiana Purchase.  In 1854, the Kansas Territory was organized, then in 1861 Kansas became the 34th U.S. state.  In 1872, Harvey County was founded.

A post office was established as Bethel College on December 19, 1934, then later it was renamed to North Newton on December 1, 1938.

Geography
North Newton is located at coordinates 38.0722333, -97.3455918 in the state of Kansas, along the north side of the city of Newton.

Climate
The climate in this area is characterized by hot, humid summers and generally mild to cool winters.  According to the Köppen Climate Classification system, North Newton has a humid subtropical climate, abbreviated "Cfa" on climate maps.

Area attractions
 Kauffman Museum at Bethel College

Demographics

2010 census
As of the census of 2010, there were 1,759 people, 710 households, and 387 families living in the city. The racial makeup of the city was 94.7% White, 1.4% African American, 0.6% Native American, 0.9% Asian, 1.0% from other races, and 1.5% from two or more races. Hispanic or Latino of any race were 4.2% of the population.

There were 710 households, of which 16.3% had children under the age of 18 living with them, 50.8% were married couples living together, 3.0% had a female householder with no husband present, 0.7% had a male householder with no wife present, and 45.5% were non-families. 43.0% of all households were made up of individuals, and 32% had someone living alone who was 65 years of age or older. The average household size was 1.96 and the average family size was 2.69.

The median age in the city was 48.6 years. 13.6% of residents were under the age of 18; 21.2% were between the ages of 18 and 24; 11.5% were from 25 to 44; 20.6% were from 45 to 64; and 33.2% were 65 years of age or older. The gender makeup of the city was 45.7% male and 54.3% female.

2000 census
As of the census of 2000, there were 1,522 people, 604 households, and 335 families living in the city. The racial makeup of the city was 93.96% White, 2.04% African American, 0.20% Native American, 0.33% Asian, 0.33% Pacific Islander, 1.97% from other races, and 1.18% from two or more races. Hispanic or Latino of any race were 2.83% of the population.

There were 604 households, out of which 14.7% had children under the age of 18 living with them, 53.6% were married couples living together, 1.3% had a female householder with no husband present, and 44.4% were non-families. 42.2% of all households were made up of individuals, and 31.1% had someone living alone who was 65 years of age or older. The average household size was 1.89 and the average family size was 2.55.

In the city, the population was spread out, with 10.8% under the age of 18, 23.3% from 18 to 24, 12.4% from 25 to 44, 18.1% from 45 to 64, and 35.3% who were 65 years of age or older. The median age was 49 years. For every 100 females, there were 79.1 males. For every 100 females age 18 and over, there were 76.5 males.

As of 2000 the median income for a household in the city was $36,974, and the median income for a family was $52,500. Males had a median income of $40,769 versus $23,056 for females. The per capita income for the city was $18,869. About 3.6% of families and 6.8% of the population were below the poverty line, including 5.3% of those under age 18 and 6.8% of those age 65 or over.

Government
The North Newton government consists of a mayor and five council members.  The council meets the 2nd Monday of each month at 7PM.
 City Hall, 2601 N Main.

Education

Primary and secondary education
The community is served by Newton USD 373 public school district.

College
North Newton is home to Bethel College, the oldest Mennonite college in the United States since its founding in 1887.

Infrastructure

Transportation
Interstate I-135 runs along the north side of North Newton.

Utilities
 Internet
 Cable is provided by Cox Communications.
 Wireless is provided by Pixius Communications.
 Satellite is provided by HughesNet, StarBand, WildBlue.
 TV
 Cable is provided by Cox Communications.
 Satellite is provided by DirecTV, Dish Network.
 Terrestrial is provided by regional digital TV stations.
 Telephone 
 Landline is provided by AT&T.
 Cellular is provided by AT&T Mobility.
 Electricity
 City is provided by Westar Energy.
 Gas
 Service is provided by Kansas Gas Service.
 Water
 City is provided by City of Newton, billed by City of North Newton.
 Rural is provided by Harvey County RWD #1 (map).
 Sewer
 Service is billed by City of North Newton.
 Trash
 Service is billed by City of North Newton.

Notable people

Kate E. Brubacher, United States Attorney for the District of Kansas
Rachel deBenedet, actress and singer.

See also
 List of people from Harvey County, Kansas
 National Register of Historic Places listings in Harvey County, Kansas
 Bethel Threshers
 Threshing Stone
 Chisholm Trail

References

Further reading

External links

City
 
 North Newton - Directory of Public Officials, League of Kansas Municipalities
Historical
 Harvey County Genealogical Society
 Harvey County Roots
 , from Hatteberg's People on KAKE TV news
Maps
 North Newton City Map, KDOT
 Topo Map of Newton / North Newton / Walton area, USGS
 Harvey County Maps: Current, Historic, KDOT

Cities in Kansas
Cities in Harvey County, Kansas
Wichita, KS Metropolitan Statistical Area